Andrew Mark Bond (born 16 March 1986) is an English professional footballer who last played as a central midfielder for  club AFC Telford United. He has played in the Football League for Colchester United, Crewe Alexandra, Bristol Rovers, Stevenage and Crawley Town

Career
Wigan Junior Latics 1995-1997.  Bond was an integral part of the WJL side that won the Warrington league title 3 seasons in a row. He started as a central midfielder but when manager Dave Harrison was appointed he was deployed as a centre half alongside Chris Travis and in front of the Goalkeeper Paul Harrison.  He was spotted by Crewe Scouts against Leigh RMI in an 2-2 draw away where keeper Harrison ran the length of the pitch to celebrate a late Damon Martland Equaliser from 25 yards.

Crewe Alexandra and Barrow 
Bond was born in Wigan, Greater Manchester. He began his career at Crewe Alexandra, but never made a first-team appearance despite being a regular for the reserve team. He joined Conference North club Lancaster City in August 2005 on loan.

Bond signed for Conference North club Barrow in 2006 after being released by Crewe. He impressed at Barrow and had a successful spell, helping the club achieve promotion to the Conference Premier through the play-offs in the 2007–08 season. In the 2009–10 season, Bond was a key player in Barrow's progression to the third round of the FA Cup, where they lost 3–0 to Sunderland and in their victorious FA Trophy campaign. During this season, Bond reportedly attracted the attention of several Championship clubs, including Leicester City, Peterborough and Preston North End. He left Barrow at the end of the 2009–10 season after turning down the offer of a new contract.

Colchester United 
Bond signed for League One club Colchester United on 30 June 2010 on a two-year contract. Manager John Ward  described him as "a marauding midfield player with a lot of energy and running work in him." He made his Football League debut on 7 August when starting in a 2–2 draw away to Exeter City. On 26 July 2011, Bond was involved in a nasty clash of heads with goalkeeper Mark Cousins during a friendly against local rivals Ipswich Town. With medical treatment required at the stadium, the match was abandoned by the match officials, with Bond then taken straight to hospital. He was released from hospital the following day. He went on to make 43 appearances in the 2011–12 season, scoring 4 goals. Bond joined his former club Crewe Alexandra, now in League One, on 28 September 2012 on a one-month loan.

Bond scored an 89th-minute winner in the opening match of the 2013–14 season on 3 August 2013 after coming on as a substitute two minutes earlier, with a shot from eight yards from Drey Wright's pass, to secure a 1–0 away victory over Gillingham. He joined League Two club Bristol Rovers on 12 September on a one-month loan, linking up with former manager John Ward. Bond made his debut two days later, starting in a 2–0 away defeat to Dagenham & Redbridge. He had his contract with Colchester terminated by mutual consent on 8 January 2014, with his playing time restricted in the 2013–14 season .

Chester 
Following his release from Colchester, Bond signed for Conference Premier club Chester on 24 January 2014 on a contract to the end of the 2013–14 season, having reportedly turned down offers from Football League clubs. He made his debut the following day as a 55th-minute substitute in Chester's 3–0 away defeat to Forest Green Rovers.

Crawley Town 
The midfielder joined the club on 19 February 2016 on a contract until the end of the season, and made his debut the following day in a 1–1 draw against Plymouth Argyle. He was released by the club in May that year.

AFC Fylde 
The midfielder joined the National League North club in the summer of 2016, He helped the team win the league title and promotion in his first season, and then the play-offs in the NAtional League the following year.  He was released in May 2019.

York City and later career 
Bond signed for National League North club York City on 25 June 2019. After a season with the Minstermen, Bond briefly signed for Northern Premier League side Buxton, before switching to divisional rivals Matlock Town before the start of the 2020/21 season. In November 2020, Bond moved again, joining National League North AFC Telford United.

Career statistics

Honours
Barrow
Conference North play-offs: 2008
FA Trophy: 2009–10

AFC Fylde
National League North: 2016–17
FA Trophy: 2018–19

References

External links

Profile at the York City F.C. season

1986 births
Living people
Footballers from Wigan
English footballers
Association football midfielders
Crewe Alexandra F.C. players
Lancaster City F.C. players
Barrow A.F.C. players
Colchester United F.C. players
Bristol Rovers F.C. players
Chester F.C. players
Stevenage F.C. players
Chorley F.C. players
Crawley Town F.C. players
AFC Fylde players
York City F.C. players
National League (English football) players
English Football League players